Efraim Faramir Sixten Fransesco Vindalf Cederqvist Leo (born October 5, 1997 in Stockholm) is a Swedish singer and songwriter. He took part in Melodifestivalen 2021 with the song "Best of Me".

Career
Efraim Leo first came to prominence in 2016 when he was featured on the single "Show You the Light" by MARC (Markus Lidén). The song rose to #12 on the Billboard Dance Club Songs Chart. He released his debut single "You Got Me Wrong" in 2018 and his debut EP "Timing" together with two singles "One of Them Girls" and "Talk to Me" in 2020. He has written songs for the South Korean girl group Red Velvet, the Russian-Azerbaijani singer Emin among others.

Efraim participated in Melodifestivalen 2021 with the song "Best of Me" which he co-wrote with Cornelia Jakobsdotter, Amanda Björkegren and Herman Gardarfve. He competed in the fourth round where he moved to "second chance" round.

Discography

EPs

Singles

Featured in

References

External links

Swedish male singers
1997 births
Living people
Melodifestivalen contestants of 2021